The fourth season of the Russian reality talent show The Voice premiered on September 4, 2015 on Channel One.
Dmitry Nagiev returned as the show's presenter. Alexander Gradsky returned as coach. Basta, Polina Gagarina, and Grigory Leps replaced Dima Bilan, Pelageya, and Leonid Agutin as coaches.

Hieromonk Fotiy was announced the winner on December 25, 2015, marking Grigory Leps first win as a coach and the first new coach to win. For the first time ever, the final two artists were both male.

Coaches and presenter

 
The coaching panel saw a change for the first time since the start of the show. Joining coach Alexander Gradsky was Basta, Polina Gagarina and Grigory Leps. Dima Bilan, Pelageya and Leonid Agutin were substituted in order to focus on their music careers. However, Bilan and Agutin will be returning in the following season.
 
Dmitry Nagiev returned for his 4th season as a presenter.

Teams
 Colour key

Blind auditions 
Colour key

Episode 1 (4 September) 
The coaches performed "Теперь ты в „Голосе“!" at the start of the show.

Note: Dima Bilan, a former coach of The Voice, made a special performance with the song "Ночной каприз" in this episode. No coach pressed their button.

Episode 2 (11 September)

Episode 3 (18 September)

Episode 4 (25 September)

Episode 5 (2 October)

Episode 6 (9 October) 
Note: Lolita Milyavskaya made a special performance with the song "Снилось мне" in this episode. All four coaches turned for her.

The Battles
The Battles round started with episode 7 and ended with episode 10 (broadcast on 16, 23, 30 October 2015; on 6 November 2015). The coaches can steal two losing artists from another coach. Contestants who win their battle or are stolen by another coach will advance to the Knockout rounds.
Colour key

The Knockouts
The Knockouts round started with episode 11 and ended with episode 13 (broadcast on 13, 20, 27 November 2016).

The top 24 contestants will then move on to the "Live Shows".
Colour key

Live shows
Colour key:

Week 1, 2: Quarterfinals (4 and 11 December)
The Top 24 performed on Fridays, 4 and 11 December 2015. The two artists with the fewest votes from each team left the competition by the end of each episode.

Week 3: Semifinal (18 December)
The Top 8 performed on Friday, 18 December 2015. The one artists with the fewest votes from each team left the competition by the end of the night.

Week 4: Final (December 25) 
The Top 4 performed on Friday, 25 December 2015. This week, the four finalists performed two solo cover songs and a duet with their coach.

Reception

Rating

References

The Voice (Russian TV series)
2015 Russian television seasons